This is a list of Hibbertia species accepted by Plants of the World Online as at March 2021:

References

Hibbertia
Hibbertia